The Oklahoma Republican Party is the Oklahoma state affiliate of the Republican Party (GOP). Along with the Oklahoma Democratic Party, it is one of the two major parties in the state.

It is currently the dominant party in the state, controlling all five of Oklahoma's U.S. House seats, both U.S. Senate seats, the governorship, and has supermajorities in both houses of the state legislature.

Current structure and composition
The Oklahoma Republican Party headquarters is located on North Lincoln Boulevard in Oklahoma City. Additionally, the state party has a Tulsa office on East 51st Street. They host the biennial state conventions in odd-numbered years, in which they elect executive officers and delegates to the Republican National Committee.

The state party coordinates campaign activities with Republican candidates and county parties and receives some funding from the national GOP organizations.

History

Territorial period through 1930s
The Oklahoma Republican Party takes its roots from the territorial period, gaining a larger portion of its support from the Northwestern part of the state, where migrants from the state of Kansas brought with them Republican political leanings of the time. For most of Oklahoma history, the Oklahoma Republican Party has the fewest members in the old Indian Territory or the area located in the Southeast.

Republicans held the American presidency during most of the territorial period, resulting in the appointments of Republican territorial governors. Despite the dominance of Republicans as governor and delegate, the two main parties had almost reached parity in the territorial legislature by statehood.

The Republican Party at the time of statehood in 1907 was not the party of most Oklahomans, but was the party of most African-Americans. Republican A. C. Hamlin was Oklahoma's first black legislator, serving in the first legislature of the new state.

Republicans experienced a short-lived resurgence in the early 1920s, with the election of John W. Harreld in 1920 as the first Republican United States senator for the state of Oklahoma. During this time the Republican Party had gained a majority of the state's seats in United States Congress, attaining five of the nine seats available. The Oklahoma House of Representatives saw their first Republican majority and first Republican Speaker of the Oklahoma House of Representatives from 1921 to 1923. The first female member of the Oklahoma House of Representatives was a Republican.

In the 1928 election, Republicans gained 26 new seats in the Oklahoma House of Representatives due in part to the low popularity of the time of presidential candidate Al Smith and the incumbent governor's stumping on his behalf. With a total of forty-seven seats, they were only five seats from having a majority. With thirteen Democratic members, they elected a coalition Democratic Speaker over the incumbent speaker.

But it was the 1930s or The Great Depression that would prove to be the most troublesome for Republicans in Oklahoma. It was during this time that Republican voters had shifted their support to the revitalized Democratic Party.

Late 20th century

Beginning in the 1960s, the Oklahoma Republican party made gains in voter registration and state legislative seats. Henry Bellmon won election as Oklahoma's first Republican governor in 1962, by appealing to Democratic voters and as an anti-corruption candidate. Only 18 percent of Oklahomans were registered as Republicans at the time.

Bellmon's term helped increase the image of Republicans in Oklahoma. Under his administration, total highway projects increased 46 percent over the previous administration and the first retirement system for state employees was created. Bellmon also oversaw the racial integration of Oklahoma schools and the court-ordered reapportionment of the state electoral districts.

Bellmon won election to the United States Senate in 1968. Republican Don Nickles succeeded Bellmon in 1980.

In 1990, black Republican J.C. Watts was elected as Oklahoma's first black statewide officeholder, serving on the Oklahoma Corporation Commission, serving as a member of the commission from 1990 to 1995 and as chairman from 1993 to 1995.

21st century

2000s
After the 2004 Presidential Election, Republicans gained control of the Oklahoma House of Representatives for the first time since 1921.

2010s
In 2010, Republicans increased their gains in the Oklahoma House of Representatives and took majority control of the Oklahoma Senate.  Furthermore, Republicans captured every statewide office and came within six percentage points of capturing the 2nd District (the only Congressional seat that it did not already hold); in 2012 it would capture that seat as well and gain supermajority control of both chambers of the Oklahoma Legislature.

In 2015, the number of registered Republican voters overtook the number of registered Democratic voters for the first time in the state's history (as of January 15, 2015, there are 886,153 registered Republicans, 882,686 registered Democrats, and 261,429 independent voters).

2020s
After Joe Biden won the 2020 election and Donald Trump refused to concede while making false claims of fraud, Oklahoma Republican Party head John R. Bennett said he would support a primary challenge against incumbent Oklahoma Senator James Lankford because Lankford refused to object to the certification of the Electoral College results in Congress.

On July 27, 2021 the Jewish Federation of Tulsa and Greater Oklahoma City denounced the Oklahoma Republican Party's use of the yellow Star of David in a Facebook post by the party. The picture included a yellow Star of David with the words "Unvaccinated" accompanied by numbers meant to be reminiscent of the numbers tattooed on victims of the Holocaust. The post called on party members to call Lieutenant Governor of Oklahoma, who was acting Governor of Oklahoma at the time, to call a special legislative session to pass legislation banning vaccine mandates. The post was denounced by many high-ranking members of the Oklahoma Republican Party including Governor Kevin Stitt, Lt. Governor Matt Pinnell, U.S. Senators James Lankford & Jim Inhofe, U.S. Congressman Markwayne Mullin, and both the Oklahoma Legislature's leaders Greg Treat and Charles McCall. The post was also denounced in separate statements by Oklahoma Superintendent of Public Instruction Joy Hofmeister and Oklahoma Republican Party Vice Chair Shane Jemison. The American Jewish Committee and the Jewish Federation also denounced the Facebook post. On August 1, 2021, Oklahoma Republican Party Chairman John Bennett defended his comments, saying “When they put that on the Jews, they weren’t sending them directly to the gas chambers, they weren’t sending them directly to the incineraries. This came before that," and  “It’s not about the star. It’s about a totalitarian government.” The same day The Norman Transcript reported a majority of Republicans are unhappy with Bennett and that plans were in the works to remove him from office. Removal of a sitting chair of the Oklahoma Republican Party requires either the vice-chair or one of the other two national committee members to call for a vote for removal. After the vote, a 10 day notice is given before the state committee votes on the removal. Some Republican groups supported Bennett including the Oklahoma Second Amendment Association President Don Spencer and Tulsa County Republican Chairwoman Ronda Vuillemont-Smith.

Electoral history

Note:

Notable Oklahoma Republicans

 A. C. Hamlin, Oklahoma's first black state legislator after statehood
 George B. Schwabe, first Republican Speaker of the Oklahoma House of Representatives
 Bessie S. McColgin, one of Oklahoma's first female state legislators
 John W. Harreld, Oklahoma's first Republican U.S. Senator
 Congresswoman Alice Mary Robertson, Oklahoma's first (and the nation's second) woman to be elected to Congress, first woman to defeat an incumbent congressman
 Governor Henry Bellmon, Oklahoma's first Republican governor
 Governor Dewey F. Bartlett
 Governor Mary Fallin
 Governor Frank Keating
 Choctaw chief Green McCurtain
 Choctaw chief Gary Batton
 Cherokee chief Ross Swimmer
 Speaker of the Chickasaw Tribal Legislature Lisa Johnson Billy
 Edward P. McCabe, founder of Langston, Oklahoma, leading figure to stimulate black migration into what was then the territory of Oklahoma
 U.S. Senator Don Nickles
 Bud Wilkinson, legendary University of Oklahoma football coach (lost 1964 U.S. Senate election to Fred R. Harris)
 U.S. Representative J.C. Watts, Oklahoma's first black U.S. Representative
 U.S. Representative and U.S. Senator Tom Coburn
 U.S. Senator James Inhofe
 Oklahoma Secretary of Transportation Neal McCaleb
 Historian Muriel Hazel Wright
 Christian Evangelist Oral Roberts
 T.W. Shannon, Oklahoma's first black Speaker of the Oklahoma House of Representatives
 Governor Kevin Stitt

Current elected officials
As of 2015 the Oklahoma Republican Party controls 11 out of the 12 statewide executive offices and holds majorities in both the Oklahoma Senate and the Oklahoma House of Representatives; Republicans also hold both of the state's U.S. Senate seats and all five of the state's U.S. House seats.

Members of Congress

U.S. Senate

U.S. House of Representatives

State Officials

Statewide offices
Governor: Kevin Stitt
Lieutenant Governor: Matt Pinnell
Secretary of State: Brian Bingman
State Auditor and Inspector: Cindy Byrd
Attorney General: Gentner Drummond
Treasurer: Todd Russ
Superintendent of Public Instruction: Ryan Walters
Labor Commissioner: Leslie Osborn
Insurance Commissioner: Glen Mulready
Corporation Commissioners: Bob Anthony, Todd Hiett and Dana Murphy

Legislative leadership
President Pro Tem of the Senate: Greg Treat
Senate Majority Floor Leader: Kim David
Speaker of the House: Charles McCall
House Majority Floor Leader: Josh West

City officials
 Oklahoma City Mayor David Holt
 Tulsa Mayor G. T. Bynum

Republican Governors 
, there have been a total of six Republican Party Governors.

See also

 Oklahoma
 Oklahoma Democratic Party
 Oklahoma Libertarian Party
 Oklahoma's congressional districts
 Politics of Oklahoma
 Republican Party

References

External links
 Oklahoma Republican Party Home Page
 Oklahoma Federation of College Republicans
 Oklahoma Republican Party Grassroots Platform 2005
 Current Oklahoma Republican Elected Officials.
 Oklahoma Historical Society page listing Oklahoma Governors.
 Lawton Politics
 Voices of Oklahoma interview with Henry Bellmon. First person interview conducted on April 14, 2009 with Henry Bellmon. Original audio and transcript archived with Voices of Oklahoma oral history project.

Republican Party (United States) by state
Republican Party